A folk festival celebrates traditional folk crafts and folk music. This list includes folk festivals worldwide, except those with only a partial focus on folk music or arts.  Folk festivals may also feature folk dance or ethnic foods.

Handicrafting has long been exhibited at such events and festival-like gatherings, as it has its roots in the rural crafts. Like folk art, handicraft output often has cultural, political, and/or religious significance. Folk art encompasses art produced from an indigenous culture or by peasants or other laboring tradespeople. In contrast to fine art, folk art is primarily utilitarian and decorative rather than purely aesthetic, and is often sold at festivals by tradespeople or practicing amateurs. As at folk festivals, such art and handicraft may also appear at historical reenactments and events such as Renaissance fairs.

Asia

Bangladesh 

 Dhaka International Folk Fest

India
 Gavari - Sacred Dance Drama Festival

Israel
 Jacob's Ladder

Europe

 Europeade (held each year in a different European country)

Bosnia and Herzegovina
 Ilidža Folk Music Festival
 Ilidža International Children's Folklore Festival

Belgium

 Boombal Festival

Bulgaria
Stara planina fest Balkan folk

Denmark

Tønder Festival

Estonia

Viljandi Folk Festival

Finland

 Kaustinen Folk Music Festival

France

 Festival Interceltique de Lorient
 Rencontres Internationales de Luthiers et Maîtres-Sonneurs

Germany

Festival-Mediaval XIV, "Folk of the World"

Ireland

Temple Bar TradFest

Lithuania

Kaziuko mugė, Vilnius
Mėnuo Juodaragis, Zarasai
Parbėg laivelis, Klaipeda

Netherlands
 Castlefest

Russia
Empty Hills, Kaluga Oblast
Grushinsky festival, near Samara

Spain

Interceltic Festival of Avilés
Interceltic Festival of Morrazo
Ortigueira's Festival of Celtic World

United Kingdom

Beverley Folk Festival
Cambridge Folk Festival
Celtic Connections
England's Medieval Festival
Edinburgh Folk Festival
Fairport's Cropredy Convention
FolkEast Festival
The Green Man Festival
Inter Varsity Folk Dance Festival
Middlewich Folk and Boat Festival
Shetland Folk Festival
Shrewsbury Folk Festival
Sidmouth Folk Festival
Soma Festival
Wickham Festival
Wimborne Folk Festival

North America

Honduras

 Encuentro Folklórico Nacional El Grande de Grandes

Canada

Calgary Folk Music Festival
Canmore Folk Music Festival
Edmonton Folk Music Festival
 Winnipeg Folk Festival (Birds Hill)
 Celtic Colours (Cape Breton)
 Stan Rogers Folk Festival (Canso)
CityFolkFestival (Ottawa)
Emerald Music Festival
Hillside Festival (Guelph)
Home County Folk Festival (London)
Mariposa Folk Festival (Orillia)
Mill Race Festival of Traditional Folk Music (Cambridge)
Northern Lights Festival Boréal (Sudbury)
Red Rock Folk Festival (Red Rock)
Regina Folk Festival
Summerfolk Music and Crafts Festival (Owen Sound)
TD Canada Trust Sunfest (London)

United States

Alaska
Alaska Folk Festival

California
Big Sur Folk Festival
Hardly Strictly Bluegrass Festival

District of Columbia

Smithsonian Folklife Festival

Florida
Florida Folk Festival

Indiana
Feast of the Hunters' Moon

Maine
American Folk Festival

Massachusetts
Lowell Folk Festival
New England Folk Festival

Montana
Montana Folk Festival

New Jersey
New Jersey Folk Festival

New York
Falcon Ridge Folk Festival
Old Songs Festival

North Carolina
Folkmoot USA

North Dakota
Norsk Høstfest

Oklahoma
Woody Guthrie Folk Festival

Oregon
Sisters Folk Festival

Pennsylvania
Flood City Music Festival
Philadelphia Folk Festival
Pittsburgh Folk Festival

Rhode Island
Newport Folk Festival

Tennessee
The Americana Folk Festival

Texas
Kerrville Folk Festival

Traveling
National Folk Festival

Washington
Northwest Folklife

Wisconsin
Great River Folk Fest
Holiday Folk Fair
Mile of Music

Oceania

Australia

National Folk Festival
Woodford Folk Festival

New Zealand

 Whare Flat Folk Festival - held over the New Year period at Whare Flat near Dunedin; run by Dunedin's New Edinburgh Folk Club

References

Further reading
 Coffin, Tristam P.; Cohen, Hennig, (editors), Folklore in America; tales, songs, superstitions, proverbs, riddles, games, folk drama and folk festivals, Garden City, N.Y. : Doubleday, 1966. Selections from the Journal of American folklore. Cf. chapter on "Folk Drama and Folk Festival", pp. 195–225,